John Shute (died 1563) was an English artist and architect who was born in Cullompton, Devon. His book, The First and Chief Grounds of Architecture, was the first work in English on classical architecture. Shute's patron was John Dudley, 1st Duke of Northumberland, for whom he built a residential wing at Dudley Castle. He was also known as a painter of miniatures.

See also
Kenilworth Castle

Notes

References 
Morris, R. K. (2010): Kenilworth Castle English Heritage

Further reading 
Shute, John (1563). The first and chief groundes of architecture used in all the auncient and famous monymentes & with a farther & more ample discouse uppon the same, than hitherto hath been set out by any other

Year of birth missing
1563 deaths
Architects from Devon
16th-century English painters
English male painters
16th-century English architects
People from Cullompton